Keith White (born 11 February 1934) is a former  Australian rules footballer who played with Hawthorn in the Victorian Football League (VFL).

Notes

External links 

Living people
1934 births
Australian rules footballers from Victoria (Australia)
Hawthorn Football Club players
Box Hill Football Club players